Pablo Escudero Morales (born July 6, 1973) is a Mexican politician and lawyer, member of the Ecologist Green Party of Mexico (PVEM) and former federal deputy and senator. From 2016 to 2017, he served as President of the Senate of Mexico.

Studies and professional career 
Pablo Escudero graduated with a law degree from the Universidad Anáhuac and a master's in public administration from the National Institute of Public Administration in Madrid, Spain.

He began his career in public administration in 1997 as the coordinator of the program for responsibilities of public servants of the Mexican Social Security Institute (IMSS). After leaving in 2000, he returned to the IMSS the next year as private secretary to the comptroller. After brief stints at Pemex and the Secretariat of the Civil Service, he moved to the National Human Rights Commission, where from 2003 to 2005 he served as private secretary to CNDH president José Luis Soberanes Fernández; he then was the CNDH's secretary of administration until 2006 and senior officer of the institution from 2006 to 2009.

Legislative career 
In 2009, he was elected as a proportional representation federal deputy from the PVEM to the LXI Legislature of the Mexican Congress year 2012. In this legislature, he was president of the Civil Service Commission and secretary of the Oversight Commission for the Superior Auditor of the Federation and National Defense Commission.

In 2012, he was nominated by the coalition of the Institutional Revolutionary Party (PRI) and PVEM as part of its senatorial ticket for the Federal District. The ticket placed second, and Escudero was elected as the minority senator from the Federal District for the LXII and LXIII Legislatures. He served as chair of the Anti-Corruption and Citizen Participation Commission  and member of commissions on Human Rights, the Federal District and Constitutional Points.

On August 31, 2016, he was elected President of the Senate for a six-month term.

Personal life
Pablo Escudero is married to Sylvana Beltrones Sanchez, daughter of PRI politician Manlio Fabio Beltrones.

References 

Universidad Anáhuac México alumni
Ecologist Green Party of Mexico politicians
Presidents of the Senate of the Republic (Mexico)
1973 births
Living people
21st-century Mexican politicians